Igor Astarloa Askasibar (born March 29, 1976 in Ermua, Basque Country) is a retired cyclist from Spain.

Career
Astarloa turned professional with the Italian cycling team  and enjoyed his best season in 2003 with team  when he won the Flèche Wallonne and the road race title at the World Cycling Championships at Hamilton, Canada. The following year, he joined , but when the team temporarily stopped racing due to a doping scandal, he was released to join . During the 2006 transfer season it was announced that he was to leave Team Barloworld, the Continental Circuit team for which Astarloa had ridden for the last several years, and join Team Milram, a member of the UCI ProTour.

Team Milram terminated its contract with Astarloa in May 2008 following disclosures that he had shown "irregular blood values", as reported by Focus magazine. He joined the Amica Chips-Knauf team, which folded in May 2009. Soon after, in June 2009, Astarloa was one of the first five riders to fall foul of the Union Cycliste International's new biological passport system, introduced to combat doping by competitive cyclists. Astarloa was unable to secure another contract that season, and retired in January 2010.

Doping conviction
On 1 December 2010, the Union Cycliste International announced that the Spanish Cycling Federation’s Disciplinary Commission had handed down a two-year suspension and a €35,000 fine to Igor Astarloa. According to Cyclingnews.com, Astarloa's blood samples had come under considerable scrutiny prior to the events of 2008-09 and in the wake of his 2003 world championships victory, although he was never punished for any infraction.

Major results

1999
 4th Gran Premio della Liberazione
2000
 9th Road race, National Road Championships
 9th Gran Premio della Costa Etruschi
2001
 1st GP Primavera
 5th GP Miguel Induráin
 6th Clásica de Almería
 7th HEW Cyclassics
2002
 1st  Overall Brixia Tour
 1st Stage 2a
 2nd Clásica de San Sebastián
 2nd HEW Cyclassics
 2nd Japan Cup
 7th Paris–Tours
2003
 1st  Road race, UCI Road World Championships
 1st La Flèche Wallonne
 1st Stage 3 Volta a la Comunitat Valenciana
 3rd Rund um den Henninger Turm
 4th HEW Cyclassics
 10th Amstel Gold Race
2004
 2nd GP Industria & Artigianato di Larciano
 3rd HEW Cyclassics
 4th Overall Tirreno–Adriatico
 6th Milan–San Remo
 9th Overall Brixia Tour
1st  Points classification
1st Stage 1
2005
 Vuelta a Burgos
1st  Points classification
1st Stage 2 
 4th Overall Brixia Tour
 5th Paris–Brussels
 6th Coppa Placci
 7th Gran Premio de Llodio
 10th Clásica de San Sebastián
2006
 1st Milano–Torino
 6th Overall Critérium International
 8th Gran Premio di Chiasso

Grand Tour general classification results timeline

See also
 List of doping cases in cycling

References

External links

1976 births
Living people
People from Ermua
Cyclists from the Basque Country (autonomous community)
Spanish male cyclists
Cyclists at the 2004 Summer Olympics
Olympic cyclists of Spain
UCI Road World Champions (elite men)
Doping cases in cycling
Spanish sportspeople in doping cases
Sportspeople from Biscay